Luke 21 is the twenty-first chapter of the Gospel of Luke in the New Testament of the Christian Bible. It records the observations and predictions of Jesus Christ delivered in the temple in Jerusalem. The book containing this chapter is anonymous, but early Christian tradition uniformly affirmed that Luke the Evangelist composed this Gospel as well as the Acts of the Apostles.

Text
The original text was written in Koine Greek. This chapter is divided into 38 verses.

Textual witnesses
Some early manuscripts containing the text of this chapter are:
Papyrus 75 (AD 175-225)
Codex Vaticanus (325-350)
Codex Sinaiticus (330-360)
Codex Bezae (~400)
Codex Washingtonianus (~400)
Codex Alexandrinus (400-440)
Codex Ephraemi Rescriptus (~450; extant verses 21-38)

Lesson of the widow's two mites (21:1-4)

Verses 1-4 record Jesus's observation that a poor widow, offering two mites, had genuinely contributed more to the temple than the gifts offered by rich people.  records the same event.

The beauty of the Temple (21:5-6)
Some spoke of the temple ... (verse 5: , tinōn legontōn peri tou hierou).
The New International Version translates these words as "Some of his disciples ...", but some other versions suggest "some people" i.e. not specifically disciples of Jesus. Protestant theologian Heinrich Meyer argues that "it is plain from the discourse itself" that Jesus was speaking to his disciples.

The "beautiful stones" and the "gifts dedicated to God" both contribute to the splendor of the temple. Luke sets this dialogue inside the temple itself, whereas in Matthew and Mark it is set outside the temple.

The destruction of the Temple (21:20-24)
Matthew and Mark state that Jesus spoke privately to his disciples on Mount Olivet about the end times and the destruction of Jerusalem: see Olivet Discourse. Luke does not present this teaching as delivered privately:
In the daytime, He was teaching in the temple, but at night He went out and stayed on the mountain called Olivet. Then early in the morning all the people came to Him in the temple to hear Him.

He tells them, These things which you see: the days will come in which not one stone shall be left upon another that shall not be thrown down. They (whether it be his disciples or his audience more generally) ask when this will be. In Mark's account, the question is asked by Peter, James, John and Andrew.

Parable of the Budding Fig Tree (21:29-33)

This parable was told by Jesus Christ and in the New Testament is found in Matthew , Mark , and Luke . This parable, about the Kingdom of God, involves a fig tree, as does the equally brief parable of the barren fig tree, with which it should not be confused. Luke presents this parable as eschatological in nature: like the leaves of the fig tree, the signs spoken of in the Olivet discourse of Luke 21:5-28  indicate the coming of the Kingdom of God.

See also 
 Jerusalem
 Ministry of Jesus
 Olivet Discourse
 Parables of Jesus
 Other related Bible parts: Matthew 24, Mark 12, Mark 13

References

External links 
 King James Bible - Wikisource
English Translation with Parallel Latin Vulgate
Online Bible at GospelHall.org (ESV, KJV, Darby, American Standard Version, Bible in Basic English)
Multiple bible versions at Bible Gateway (NKJV, NIV, NRSV etc.)

Gospel of Luke chapters